Praecardiida  is an extinct order of fossil saltwater clams, marine bivalve molluscs.

References

External links 
 
 

 
Bivalve orders
Prehistoric bivalves